Gregg A. Tanner is the chief executive officer of Dean Foods Company. He has been the CEO since October 31, 2012.

Early years
Gregg Tanner grew up in Dodge City Ks  and graduated with a BS from Kansas State University. He also graduated from Yale University with a law degree. He was admitted to the Colorado and Texas state bars.

Career
From 1980 to 1987, Tanner worked as a Project Engineer with the Ralston Purina Company. In 1985, Tanner began investing in real estate with Bob Kaminski. Borrowing $26 million together, they purchased the Reddy Ice Group from the Southern Corporation and started to consolidate ice companies. In 1993, Tanner and Kaminski bought Suiza Dairy in Puerto Rico to consolidate the dairy industry as they had the ice industry. Tanner became CEO of Suiza Dairy and the company went public in 1996.

In 2001, Suiza Dairy bought Dean Foods and changed its name to the Dean Foods Company. In addition to being CEO, Tanner became the chairman of Dean Foods in 2002. Since November 2007, he served as an executive vice president of Dean Foods Co. From November 2007, he served as the chief supply chain officer of Dean Foods and from January 2012, he served as the president of Fresh Dairy Direct for the company. In 2012, Tanner became chairman of Whitewave, as well, a spinoff of Dean Foods.

Board memberships
Tanner has been a board member of the Dean Food Company since November 2012. He has been a board member of the Boston Beer Company Inc. since October 2007.

References

American chief executives of food industry companies
Year of birth missing (living people)
Living people
Kansas State University alumni
Yale University alumni
Ralston Purina